Još Hrvatska ni propala is a famous Croatian patriotic reveille which was penned by Ljudevit Gaj and set to music by the composer Ferdo Livadić in 1833. The song is considered the anthem of the Illyrian Movement, which constituted a great part of the Croatian national revival.
The song is strikingly similar to Polish Mazurek Dąbrowskiego. 

Gaj's story of how the song came about was related in Franjo Kuhač's work Illyrian Songwriters (Ilirski glazbenici). Travelling to Samobor to visit Livadić, Gaj thought to himself, "Croatia has not yet fallen so long as we [revivalists] are alive". At the same time he heard the sound of villagers singing in church. When he arrived at Livadić's house, he already had the words and melody ready. That night they penned several other verses, of which three became the best known and were treated as the unofficial anthem of the Illyrian Movement. 

The song was first performed publicly on February 4, 1835 in a Zagreb theatre.

Lyrics

External links
Full lyrics of Još Hrvatska ni propala

1830s songs
Croatian patriotic songs
Songs about Croatia